is a train station in the city of Ena, Gifu Prefecture, Japan, operated by the Third-sector railway operator Akechi Railway.

Lines

Station layout
Iwamura Station has two ground-level opposed, but offset side platforms connected to the station building by a level crossing. The station is staffed.

Adjacent stations

|-
!colspan=5|Akechi Railway

History
Iwamura Station opened on January 26, 1934.

Surrounding area
Iwamura Castle
Hondōri Iwamura-chō
former Iwamura Town Hall

See also
 List of Railway Stations in Japan

External links

 

Railway stations in Gifu Prefecture
Railway stations in Japan opened in 1934
Stations of Akechi Railway
Ena, Gifu